Grega Žemlja won the first edition of the tournament by defeating Aljaž Bedene 1–6, 7–5, 6–3 in the final.

Seeds

Draw

Finals

Top half

Bottom half

References
 Main Draw
 Qualifying Draw

ATP China International Tennis Challenge – Anning – Singles
2012 Singles